Yuriy Aleksandrovič Kunakov is a Russian diver who won the silver medal in the 3 m spring synchro along with Dmitri Sautin in the 2008 Summer Olympics in Beijing.

References
The Official Website of the Beijing 2008 Olympic Games

Living people
Olympic silver medalists for Russia
Russian male divers
Divers at the 2008 Summer Olympics
Olympic divers of Russia
1990 births
Sportspeople from Voronezh
Olympic medalists in diving
Medalists at the 2008 Summer Olympics